Anakapalle mandal is one of the  mandals in located in Anakapalli district of the state of Andhra Pradesh, India. It is administered under Anakapalle revenue division and its headquarters are located at Anakapalle. It is bounded by Kasimkota Mandal towards west, Munagapaka Mandal towards South, Paravada Mandal towards East, Achutapuram Mandal towards South .

Demographics

Anakapalle mandal spreads across an area of 161.62 sq km. The total population of Anakapalle Mandal is 100,418 residing in 26,224 Houses, Spread across total 64 villages and 43 panchayats and 1 Census Town . Population of males are 49,627 and females are 50,791. Urban population is 5,001 (excluding Anakapalle town, where as rural population is 95,417. The mandal has Highest rural population in Visakhapatnam district. Population in the age-group 0-6 is 10,879 of which 5,560 are male and 5,319 are female. The literacy rate of Anakapalle mandal is 56.66 with 56,903 literates in the Mandal.

Towns and villages 

 census, Thummapala is the most populated and Papayya Palem is the least populated settlement in the mandal. The mandal consists of 26 settlements. It includes 1 town and 25 villages. Anakapalle municipality was merged with Greater Visakhapatnam Municipal Corporation.

The settlements in the mandal are listed below:

Note: †–Mandal headquarter

Transport

Anakapalle mandal is well connected by road and Rail. National Highway 16 or Asian Highway 45 passes through the mandal. It also has major District roads and State Highways connecting it to nearby mandals and Visakhapatnam. APS RTC runs bus services from Anakapalle bus station to major parts of the state and Visakhapatnam.
Anakapalle railway station is on Howrah-Chennai main line. It is under Vijayawada division of South Central railway zone. Almost every Passenger and Express train passes through halts here. The mandal also has Minor railway stations like Thadi.
Visakhapatnam Airport (VTZ) is the nearest International airport at a distance of 20 km from the mandal.

The following bus routes go to Anakapalle from Visakhapatnam.

Public transportation
APSRTC runs buses to this area along these routes

See also 
 List of mandals in Andhra Pradesh

References

Mandals in Anakapalli district